A zero-byte file or zero-length file is a computer file containing no data; that is, it has a length or size of zero bytes.

Creation 
There are many ways that could manually create a zero-byte file, for example, saving empty content in a text editor, using utilities provided by operating systems, or programming to create it. On Unix-like systems, the shell command $ touch filename results in a zero-byte file . Zero-byte files may arise in cases where a program creates a file but aborts or is interrupted prematurely while writing to it. Because writes are cached in memory and only flushed to disk at a later time (page cache), a program that does not flush its writes to disk or terminate normally may result in a zero-byte file. When the zero-byte file is made, file system does not record the file's content on storage, but only updates its index table.

Metadata 
Even a file describing an empty word processor document, an image file with zero-by-zero dimensions, or an audio file of length zero seconds usually still contains metadata identifying the file format and describing some basic attributes of the file; it results in the file with some positive size. Some very simple formats do not use metadata, such as ASCII text files; these may validly be zero bytes (a common convention terminates text files with a one- or two-byte newline, however). Conversely, zero-byte files must use some disk space to be indexed by a filesystem, though none for content.

Uses 
Zero-byte files cannot be loaded or used by most applications.

IF Exist - Testing:
Use the zero-byte (zero length) file as an "exit" ramp or for a "goto" statement within a batch-file or script.  It provides a directory listing, but requires no disk space.
  IF EXIST C:\NOTHING.TXT EXIT
  IF NOT EXIST C:\NOTHING.TXT GOTO START
  :START
  REM Create the zero-length file
  C:\>type null>nothing.txt
  :EXIT

References

Bibliography 
 

Computer files